Everyoned is a supergroup side project of Chicago-area musicians.  Everyoned consists of Chris Connelly (Revolting Cocks, Pigface), Tim Kinsella (Joan of Arc and various collaborations), Brent Gutzeit (TV Pow), Liz Payne (Town & Country, Pillow), and Ben Vida (Town & Country, Bird Show).  Everyoned have released one record, Everyoned, in 2004 on Brilliante Records.

References

External links
Everyoned website at Brilliante Records

Rock music groups from Illinois
Supergroups (music)